Chelles is a commune in the eastern suburbs of Paris, France. It is located in the Seine-et-Marne department in the Île-de-France region  from the center of Paris.

History

Paleolithic artifacts were discovered by chance at Chelles by the pioneering nineteenth-century anthropologist Louis Laurent Gabriel de Mortillet (1821–1898); he named the corresponding cultural stage of the Paleolithic after the commune: «Chellean» or «Chellian», nowadays known as «Oldowan».

At the Merovingian villa of Calae the abbey of Notre-Dame-des-Chelles was founded by Balthild, a seventh-century queen of the Franks. It was largely demolished at the time of the French Revolution.

Geography
There are two main streets in Chelles, Avenue Foch and Avenue de la Résistance.

Demographics
The inhabitants are called Chellois.

Transport
Chelles is served by Chelles–Gournay station on Paris RER line  and on the Transilien Paris-Est suburban rail line .

Education
 the commune has 13,000 students in 46 public and private schools. The commune includes 19 public preschools and 16 public elementary schools.

There are also:
Four public junior high schools: Collège Beau soleil, Collège Corot, Collège de l’Europe, and Collège Weczerka - Beau Soleil and de l'Europe have Enseignement Général Professionnel Adapté (S.E.G.P.A) programmes
Three public senior high schools/sixth-form colleges, Lycée Gaston Bachelard, Lycée Professionnel Louis Lumière, and Lycée Jehan de Chelles
One private school - Institution Gasnier Guy, with private preschool and elementary school (Gasnier Guy / Ste Bathilde), junior high school (Collège Gasnier Guy), and senior high school (Lycée Gasnier Guy) divisions

Chelles includes a library, Bibliothèque Olympe de Gouges, and a media centre, Médiathèque Jean-Pierre Vernant.

Culture and recreation
The commune includes the Musée Alfred-Bonno.

There is also a public swimming pool, and a public skate park which opened in 1999.

Chelles is town twinned with the city of Lindau (Germany)

Gallery

See also
Communes of the Seine-et-Marne department

References

External links

 Official website 
 1999 Land Use, from IAURIF (Institute for Urban Planning and Development of the Paris-Île-de-France région) 
 

Communes of Seine-et-Marne
Seine-et-Marne communes articles needing translation from French Wikipedia